Grantham Ambergate Yard railway station was first opened by the Ambergate, Nottingham, Boston and Eastern Junction Railway in 1850 between Grantham and Nottingham as its first terminus.

In some literature it is referred to as "Old Wharf". However, that may have been its location adjacent to the Grantham Canal.

When the Great Northern Railway arrived in 1852, the ANB&EJR acquired running rights into its station.

The station closed on 1 August 1852.

References

Disused railway stations in Lincolnshire
Railway stations in Great Britain opened in 1850
Railway stations in Great Britain closed in 1852